Events in the year 1859 in Iceland.

Incumbents 

 Monarch: Frederick VII of Denmark
 Council President of Denmark) Carl Christian Hall (until 2 December 1859); Carl Edvard Rotwitt onwards

Events 

 The Ørnen Corvette begins patrolling Icelandic waters.

Births 

 6 January − Skúli Thoroddsen, judge and politician.
 16 January − Jón Magnússon, politician, and prime minister of Iceland.
 6 December − Einar Hjörleifsson Kvaran, novelist, poet, playwright.

References 

 
1850s in Iceland
Years of the 19th century in Iceland
Iceland
Iceland